Jayanti is a village in the Kumargram CD block in the Alipurduar subdivision of the Alipurduar district in West Bengal, India. It is one of the most famous tourist destinations of Dooars. Jayanti shares a border between India and Bhutan.

Geography

Location                    

Jayanti is a small forest village within Buxa Tiger Reserve. It is located along the Jayanti River, forming a natural border with the Bhutan hills. It is popular with hikers for its views of the surrounding landscape and wild fountains.  A 13 km trek from Buxaduar to Jayanti passes through the dense forest of the Buxa Tiger Reserve.

Jayanti also features a stalactite cave known as Mahakal cave.

Area overview
Alipurduar district is covered by two maps. It is an extensive area in the eastern end of the Dooars in West Bengal. It is undulating country, largely forested, with numerous rivers flowing down from the outer ranges of the Himalayas in Bhutan. It is a predominantly rural area with 79.38% of the population living in the rural areas. The district has 1 municipal town and 20 census towns and that means that 20.62% of the population lives in the urban areas. The scheduled castes and scheduled tribes, taken together, form more than half the population in all the six community development blocks in the district. There is a high concentration of tribal people (scheduled tribes) in the three northern blocks of the district.

Note: The map alongside presents some of the notable locations in the subdivision. All places marked in the map are linked in the larger full screen map.

Transport
The nearest railway station is Rajabhatkhawa Railway Station on the New Jalpaiguri-Alipurduar-Samuktala Road Line. Other major nearby railway stations are Alipurduar Junction Railway Station and New Alipurduar Railway Station.

Jayanti is well connected with Alipurduar Town via roadways. Cars and the travellers have to pay a fee when entering at Jayanti. 

The nearest airport is Bagdogra Airport in Siliguri.

Jayanti picture gallery

References

External links
 Everything about Jayanti
 
 
 

Protected areas of West Bengal
Tiger reserves of India
Tourist attractions in Alipurduar district
Villages in Alipurduar district